Christopher Matthew "Deuce" Vaughn II (born November 2, 2001) is an American football running back for the Kansas State Wildcats.

Early life and high school
Vaughn moved frequently growing up due to his father's occupation as a college football coach before settling in Round Rock, Texas and attended Cedar Ridge High School, where he played football and ran track. As a senior, Vaughn broke Cedar Ridge's single-season rushing record with 1,940 yards.

College career
Vaughn entered his freshman season at Kansas State as one of the Wildcats' top running backs and became the team's starter early in the season. He finished the season with 642 rushing yards and seven touchdowns on 123 carries, 25 receptions for 434 yards and two touchdowns, and seven kickoff returns for 145 yards. He was named the Big 12 Conference Offensive Freshman of the Year and second team All-Conference. Vaughn entered his sophomore season on the watchlist for the Doak Walker Award.

Statistics

Personal life
Vaughn's father, Chris, played college football at Murray State and is a scout for the Dallas Cowboys after previously working as an assistant coach at Arkansas, Ole Miss, Memphis and Texas.

Vaughn is a member of Kappa Alpha Psi fraternity.

References

External links
Kansas State Wildcats bio

Living people
2001 births
All-American college football players
American football running backs
Kansas State Wildcats football players
People from Round Rock, Texas
Players of American football from Texas